The Murder of Danny Katz was a terrorist attack carried out in 1983 in which a Palestinian militant killed 14-year-old Israeli Danny Katz. The attack, prominent among a series of attacks aimed at Israeli children during the early 1980s, shocked the Israeli public due to its brutal nature. It signified to many in the Israeli public a deterioration to their personal security at that time.

The murder 
On Thursday, December 8, 1983, the 14-year-old Israeli Danny Katz, a resident of the Denia neighborhood of Haifa, left his house to visit a friend, but disappeared en route.

After a three-day search, Katz' mutilated body was found outside a remote cave in the Sakhnin region, bearing marks of strangulation, torture, and sexual assault.

The perpetrators 
A letter found in the pile of garbage near the cave led the investigators to Samir Ghanem, a resident of Sakhnin. Ghanem initially denied the allegations, but later confessed and implicated four additional partners in crime – Ahmad Kozli, Fathi Janameh, Ali Ganayem and Atef Sabihi. All five admitted to killing Danny Katz. All were eventually found guilty of murder and sentenced to life imprisonment. Two of the assailants, Ahmad Kozli and Atef Sabihi, also confessed later on to the 1982 abduction, rape and murder of 19-year-old Israeli Daphna Carmon.

Aftermath 
The assailants' attorney Avigdor Feldman claimed that the suspects' conviction was improper due to a lack of solid evidence against the accused and the court's reliance solely on their confessions, which according to the defendants, were given under duress. In 1991 the Israeli Supreme Court ruled that the defendants' claims were not credible and that their conviction on the basis of their confessions and additional evidence were sufficient.

Following continuous public pressure, the Israeli Justice Minister David Libai ordered the attorney Judith Karp to prepare a report about the case. Following the report, an appeal for a retrial was handed to the Israeli supreme court. President of the Supreme Court Aharon Barak ruled in 1999 that a retrial would be held for the accused.

In 2000 the retrial began, a relatively rare procedure in the Israeli legal system. The defendants were convicted again in 2002 after the judges were convinced that the defendants' confessions were admissible. Defense attorney Feldman appealed to the Supreme Court, but his appeal was unanimously rejected after the court examined the evidence and ruled that the district court's verdict was well established.

In 2007 Israeli President Shimon Peres issued a pardon reducing the sentences of Danny Katz's assailants. The significance of reducing the sentence of the killers meant that they now had the option of asking the prison parole board to deduct a third of their sentences. In July 2008, the prison parole board rejected Danny Katz's assailants appeal to deduct a third of their sentences on the grounds that they are still dangerous to the public.

In 2019, an investigation by the 13tv channel, shows how the Israeli Police tortured the suspects and charged them without having any proof. After 30 years in prison, one of them was released the rest are still awaiting release.

See also
List of solved missing person cases

References

External links
 Killing shocks Jewish state – published on The Sun on December 15, 1983
 Israel Fears Child-killings May Be Terrorist Plot – published on the Montreal Gazette on December 13, 1983
 Retrial again finds five guilty of 1983 Danny Katz murder – published on Haaretz on February 26, 2002

1980s missing person cases
1983 murders in Israel
Formerly missing people
Incidents of violence against boys
Israeli murder victims
Israeli terrorism victims
Israeli torture victims
Male murder victims
Missing person cases in Israel
Murdered Israeli children
Northern District (Israel)
Terrorist attacks attributed to Palestinian militant groups
Terrorist incidents in Asia in 1983
Terrorist incidents in Israel
Terrorist incidents in Israel in the 1980s
Violence against men in Asia